The Waterloo Plains massacre occurred in June 1838 when 8 to 23 Djadjawurrung Aboriginal people were killed in a reprisal raid for the killing of two convict servants and theft of sheep.

Background 
In early 1837 the Barfold sheep run was established by William Henry Yaldwyn, when business partner and station overseer John Coppock drove 4000 sheep from the Goulburn area to a site on a creek (later named Piper's Creek) about 8 miles north of Kyneton.

In 1838, two convicts (a hut keeper and watchman) were found dead and 1200 sheep missing.

Massacre 
Coppock summoned between 16 and 19 convict men from Barfold and surrounding stations owned by Charles Ebden (Carlsruhe station) and Dr William Bowman and H Munro.

The armed and mounted party, tracked the Djadjawurrung people to their camp in a gully (now known as Waterloo Plains). At night the armed party attacked, taking the camp by surprise as they cooked the stolen sheep. The terrain meant the victims had little defence other than their spears and shields. When the attack was over, between 8 and 23 Djadjawurrung were dead and some wounded. Two of the attackers sustained minor injuries.

Chief Protector of Aborigines George Augustus Robinson reported:They fired from their horses; the blacks were down in the hole. They were out of distance of spears. One old man kept supplying them with spears and was soon shot. Great many were shot. Some other blacks held up pieces of bark to keep off the balls but it was no use. Some were shot dead with their bark in their hands.

Aftermath 
When Melbourne police magistrate William Lonsdale heard about the killing he summoned Coppock to Melbourne to explain.

In January 1840, Robinson travelled to Munro's station and crossed the Coliban River, locating the site of the killing on small hill behind an abandoned hut.

See also 
 List of massacres of Indigenous Australians

Further reading

References 

1838 in Australia
June 1838 events
Massacres of Indigenous Australians
Massacres in 1838